Starcross railway station is a small station on the Exeter to Plymouth line in the village of Starcross, Devon, England. The station is managed by Great Western Railway, who operate all trains serving it.

One of the South Devon Railway engine houses, which formerly powered the trains on this line, is situated alongside the station.

History
The station was opened by the South Devon Railway on 30 May 1846. It only had a single platform at this time, the second one being added in November 1848. It was provided with a train shed until 1906 when the station was rebuilt.

Trains were worked by atmospheric power from 13 September 1847 until 9 September 1848.  The engine house was subsequently used as a Methodist chapel; a youth club; a coal store; a museum of the atmospheric railway; and is currently the home of the Starcross Fishing and Cruising Club.

The South Devon Railway was amalgamated into the Great Western Railway on 1 February 1876, which in turn was nationalised into British Railways on 1 January 1948.

Public goods traffic was withdrawn from 6 September 1965 and coal traffic ceased on 4 December 1967.  The station became unstaffed on 3 May 1971 and the old station building was finally demolished in 1981.  The footbridge, which had been erected in 1895, was replaced by the present structure in 1999.

Stationmasters

William T. Murch ca. 1858
Benjamin Popplestone 1863 - 1894
Albert William Lofting 1894 - 1901  (formerly station master at Blenheim and Woodstock, afterwards station master at Lostwithiel)
Albert G. Hitchcock 1901 - 1904 (afterwards station master at Ilfracombe)
Arthur H. Lovelock 1905  - 1912
Ernest Willcocks 1912 - 1919
A.H. Savage 1919 - 1923 (afterwards station master at Cullompton)
Henry James Shattock 1923 - 1928
Arthur Fellender 1929 - 1937 (formerly station master at Athelney)
E.B. Davey from 1937 
Maldwyn V. Southerton ca. 1943
D.J. Wheeler ca. 1947 ca. 1950

Platform layout and facilities
Access to the platform for trains towards Exeter is up a few steps from the main A379 road through the village; the platform for trains towards Dawlish is reached by a footbridge. 

There is a waiting shelter on the platform for trains to Exeter but the other side is open to the elements.

Services

Starcross is served by Great Western Railway trains in both directions on an approximately hourly basis during the day (with extras at peak periods). The route from Exeter St Davids through Starcross to Paignton is marketed as the "Riviera Line".

There is one direct service in the morning to London Paddington with a return service in the evening. These services operate Mondays to Fridays only. The morning service to London runs via Bristol and the evening return runs via the Reading to Taunton line.

The second platform (for trains to Paignton) also serves as the access to the pier used by the Starcross to Exmouth Ferry, which forms a link in the South West Coast Path. It operates on an hourly basis during the day, from Easter to October.

References

Further reading

Railway stations in Devon
Railway stations in Great Britain opened in 1846
Former Great Western Railway stations
Railway stations served by Great Western Railway
Railway stations serving harbours and ports in the United Kingdom
DfT Category F2 stations